Maud Sulter (19 September 1960 – 27 February 2008) was a Scottish contemporary fine artist, photographer, writer, educator, feminist, cultural historian, and curator of Ghanaian heritage. She began her career as a writer and poet, becoming a visual artist not long afterwards. By the end of 1985 she had shown her artwork in three exhibitions and her first collection of poetry had been published. Sulter was known for her collaborations with other Black feminist scholars and activists, capturing the lives of Black people in Europe. She was a champion of the African-American sculptor Edmonia Lewis, and was fascinated by the Haitian-born French performer Jeanne Duval.

Early life and education 
Born on 19 September 1960 in Glasgow, Scotland, to a Scottish mother and a Ghanaian father, Maud Sulter attained a master's degree in Photographic Studies from the University of Derby. Her maternal grandfather had been an amateur photographer.

Sexuality 
In Sulter's Call and Response, she raised the topic of "the finest" and radical artists in London at the time identified as lesbians. Sulter noted that lesbian-identifying women typically went unspoken, then said: "I sensed a danger there, a danger that pulled me back from the brink of desire, the desire to know myself truly, and it took time to resolve the need to confront the danger head on." Sulter wrote of her poetry: "The central body of my poetic work is unequivocally the love poetry which is addressed to both genders."

Career

Art, photography, poetry 

Sulter participated in The Thin Black Line exhibition, curated by Lubaina Himid at the ICA in London in 1985. The exhibition displayed the art of Black and Asian women artists, re-centring the visibility of Black and Asian art in the British art scene. Sulter and Himid worked closely together on projects, curating and exhibiting their work together. 
Maud Sulter worked across photography, film, installation, collage and photomontage, sound and performance. Her work typically referenced historical and mythical subjects. Her photography was exhibited across the UK and internationally, including at the Victoria and Albert Museum in 1987, the Johannesburg Biennale (1995), and the Scottish National Portrait Gallery in 2003. She received a number of awards and residencies, among them the British Telecom New Contemporaries Award 1990 and the Momart Fellowship at Tate Liverpool, also in 1990.

As well as writing about art history and curating many exhibitions, Sulter was a poet and playwright. Her publications works include the poetry collections As a Blackwoman (1985; her poem of the same title won the Vera Bell Prize from ACER, the Afro-Caribbean Education Resource, the previous year); Zabat: Poetics of a Family Tree (1989); and Sekhmet: A Decade or So of Poems (2005). Her play, Service to Empire (2002), was inspired by the background of former Ghana head of state Jerry Rawlings. Two poems by Sulter are accessible online: "Gone But Not Forgotten" and "If Leaving You". Sulter's writings are available at the Scottish Poetry Library in Edinburgh, Glasgow Women's Library,  the Stuart Hall Library, London, Poetry Society, London, Tate Library, London, and many other libraries. 

Sulter was Principal Lecturer in Fine Art at Manchester Metropolitan University, from 1992 to 1994. lectured at a number of other English universities, and curated her own and other artists' work at British galleries since the mid-1980s, including at The People's Gallery in London, Tate Liverpool, Touchstones Rochdale, Street Level Photoworks in Glasgow, with Himid at the Elbow Room in London and at her own gallery, Rich Women of Zurich in London.

Art works

Sphinx 
Sphinx was Sulter's first major series of photographs. This series of nine black and white photographs shot in The Gambia (Harris Museum and Art Gallery Preston) was first exhibited at Sulter's solo exhibition at The Black Art Gallery in September 1987. The exhibition brochure includes a poem and statements and her manifesto: "We the women will fight... We the women will win."

Zabat 
Maud Sulter defined "Zabat" as "a sacred dance performed by groups of thirteen", "an occasion of power", possibly the origin of witches sabbat, "Blackwomen's rite of passage". In this series of nine large-scale cibachrome photographs, contemporary black women artists, musicians and writers pose as ancient muses. Each portrait represented a different muse of Greek mythology. Sulter wrote a series of prose poems for each muse, titled "Zabat Narratives".

Syrcas 
An art series named in Welsh "Syrcas" (English translation: Circus) was produced by Sulter in 1993, and is about reviving the forgotten history of black Europeans during the Holocaust and their genocide. It includes a fictional character related to the historical background of her piece created by Sulter named Monique. Sulter created a complementary poem called "Blood Money", which has been republished in English. You can access this poem by clicking this link. This series consists of a 16-work photomontage and is presented in five subdivided sets in close proximity. The photomontage artworks were created on top of postcards with landscapes on them and multiple layers of different images collaged. This work has been in an exhibition in the Chapelle de la Charité d'Arles, in Arles, France, in 2016. To view these works you can click this link and view pages 3-5.

Hysteria 
Created by Sulter in 1991 on a Momart residency at Tate Liverpool, Hysteria, according to the artist's accompanying text, "a tells the story of a 19th-century Blackwoman artist who sails from the Americas to Europe to seek fame and fortune as a sculptor. Having achieved a successful career, she disappears."  Hysteria was inspired by the life and career of Edmonia Lewis, a sculptor of African-American and Chippewa heritage. This series of black-and-white and colour photographs includes eight portraits, four pairs of still lives, each pair representing the seasons, and engraved marble plaques, initially arranged around a massive piece of marble. The central character, modelled by Sulter, is the artist Hysteria. The portrait photographs represent figures in Hysteria's social and artistic circles. Sitters include Bernardine Evaristo, Lubaina Himid, Delta Streete and musician Miles Ofuso-Danso. First exhibited at Tate Liverpool, Hysteria travelled to Rochdale, Street Level Photoworks and the Royal Festival Hall, 1991–92. To view the pieces of this exhibition click this link.

Significant Others 
A series created by Sulter in 1993 includes nine large-scale photographs mounted in wooden frames, with annotations for each image. The photographs in this exhibition were enlargements of her family's photo archive resembling her Scottish and Ghanaian heritage. Sulter appears in four of the images as a child and her growing up, semblance of her identity.

Les Bijoux 
Produced in 2002 as large-format colour Polaroid prints and named after a poem of the same name by Charles Baudelaire inspired the piece. Sulter's ideals of this poem inspired her to portray herself in the photos with passion and emotion- opposing the "common view" on this piece as sexualized. This exhibition is a series of close-up self-portraits of Sulter as a character inspired by Jeanne Duval (muse to Baudelaire). The purpose of this work is to raise awareness about African and European cultures throughout history.

Poetry in Motion 
A mixed-media piece created in 1985 and meant as a social commentary on the 20th century, this work outlined the struggles and effects of racism that African women faced during this time. Several of Sulter's poems from As a Blackwoman were included in these mixed-media collages. Poetry in Motion was exhibited in 1985 at the Institute of Contemporary Arts in London and curated by Lubaina Himid.

Twa Blak Wimmin 
Twa Blak Wimmin ("Two Black Women"), created by Sulter in 1997, was made "to recognise a more historical link between Europe and Africa." The title alludes to older Scots language and the story of historical Scottish women, "Blak Margaret" and "Blak Elene".

Jeanne Duval: A Melodrama I–IV 
Inspired by poetry written by Jeanne Duval and her way of writing "which explore[d] her sensuality, sensuality and ethnicity..." This work was created in 1994, after multiple other works inspired by Duval, such as Zabat and Les Bijoux. Sulter had a "visual fascination with Jeanne Duval" since 1988, which "willed" her to create a piece more specific to Duval. This series of four photocollages features a portrait photographer Nadar, who was close with Duval. Sulter also published a book in relation to this piece, titled Jeanne Duval: A Melodrama, which can be accessed by clicking here. This was exhibited at National Galleries of Scotland, Edinburgh, in 2003.

Blackwomen's Creativity Project 
Sulter worked with Sheba Feminist Publisher's Collective, starting in 1982. As the collective's only Black woman writer at the time, Sulter recognized an increasing need for writing tailored to Black women. She co-founded the Blackwomen's Creativity Project in the early 1980s with Ingrid Pollard. The magazine created a variety of content ranging from "hair braiding, poetry and performance".. She created her own publishing imprint, Urban Fox Press, releasing a new edition of her first collection of poetry, As a Blackwoman, along with her second poetry collection, Zabat: Poetics of a Family Tree, both in 1989.

Death and legacy
Sulter died in 2008, aged 47, after a long illness. She was survived by her mother, Elsie, as well as her two daughters and son, Ama, Efia and Alexander. 

Her work created coalitions between Black feminist and lesbian groups. Through collaborations with Black women artists, writers and photographers across the world, Sulter successfully brought awareness to the histories and continued presence of Black women figures. 

Sulter's work is held in a number of collections, including Birmingham Museum and Art Gallery, the Victoria and Albert Museum, Arts Council Collection, the British Council, McManus Dundee, Glasgow Museums, Tate, City Art Centre, Edinburgh, Women's Art Collection, Cambridge, Touchstones Rochdale, National Galleries of Scotland, Boswell Collection, St Andrews University, Harris Museum and Art Gallery, Leeds University Art Gallery, Inverness Museum and Art Gallery, the Scottish Parliament Collection, and the Government Art Collection.

In 2011–2012, her work was shown at Tate Britain, London, in the exhibition Thin Black Line(s), which was a re-staging of the seminal 1986 exhibition The Thin Black Line that was held at London's [[Institute of Contemporary Arts
]].

In 2015, Street Level Photoworks Glasgow staged a major exhibition, entitled Maud Sulter: Passion, to showcase her work and achievement, especially in photography and photomontage.Her portraits of 10 pre-eminent Scottish poets were displayed at Hillhead Library, Glasgow. Maud Sulter: Passion travelled to the Impressions Gallery, Bradford, in 2016. During 2016, Sulter's series of Syrcas photomontages was exhibited at Autograph ABP, and at Arles Photography Festival in the Chapelle de la Charité d'Arles, both curated by Autograph ABP director Mark Sealy. 

In 2017, two muses from Zabat (Calliope: the muse of epic poetry, and Terpsichore: the muse of dance) were shown at the Walker Gallery as part of the largest LGBTQ+ art exhibition in the UK, Coming Out: Sexuality, Gender, and Identity. Recent exhibitions include: Sarah Maldoror: Tricontinental Cinema, Paris, 2021 and Sulter: Centre of the Frame, Cambridge and Rochdale, 2021–22.

Exhibitions

Solo exhibitions

Group exhibitions

Publications

Books by Sulter

Books about Sulter 
 
 
  In the section by Deborah Cherry, "The Ghost Begins by Coming Back: Revenants and Returns in Maud Sulter's Photomontages"

Bibliography

External links
 "Passion - Blackwomen's Creativity: an interview with Maud Sulter", Spare Rib, Issue 220, February 1991 
 "Maud Sulter: Passion". Impressions Gallery.
 Works from the Zabat series at the V&A
 Maud Sulter on ScottishPoetryLibrary.org
 List of 1996 Johannesburg Biennial artists
 "Maud Sulter - Passion", Street Level Photoworks, Glasgow, 25 April 2015 – 21 June 2015
 "Maud Sulter - About Face", Hillhead Library, Glasgow, 17 April 2015 – 28 June 2015
 "Revisiting 'Two Invisible Case Studies': Maud Sulter & Oladélé Ajiboyé Bamgboyé", Malmö Konsthall, 29 July – 7 August 2013

1960 births
2008 deaths
20th-century Scottish dramatists and playwrights
20th-century Scottish women artists
20th-century Scottish women writers
20th-century Scottish poets
Alumni of the University of Derby
Artists from Glasgow
Black British photographers
Black British women writers
Scottish contemporary artists
Scottish people of Ghanaian descent
Scottish photographers
Scottish women poets